Mark William Slater (born February 1, 1955) is a former professional American football player who played offensive lineman for six seasons for the San Diego Chargers and Philadelphia Eagles.

References

1955 births
People from Divide County, North Dakota
Players of American football from North Dakota
American football offensive linemen
San Diego Chargers players
Philadelphia Eagles players
Minnesota Golden Gophers football players
Living people